Lower Church is a historic Episcopal church located near Hartfield, Middlesex County, Virginia.  It was constructed in 1717, and is a one-story, rectangular brick building with a clipped gable roof.  It measures 56 feet by 34 feet.

It was listed on the National Register of Historic Places in 1973.

George Washington, the first president and Founding Father of the United States, attended the school at this church.

References

Churches on the National Register of Historic Places in Virginia
Episcopal churches in Virginia
Churches completed in 1717
Buildings and structures in Middlesex County, Virginia
National Register of Historic Places in Middlesex County, Virginia
18th-century Episcopal church buildings
1717 establishments in the Thirteen Colonies